Crank It Up: The Music Album is the first musical album recorded by Jeff Foxworthy. It features many of Foxworthy's skits set to music, primarily with choruses sung by other musicians. Two comedy sketches, "S. I. N. G. L. E." and "Still More You Might Be a Redneck If…", are also featured.

The concept for the album was orchestrated after the release of Foxworthy's first album, You Might Be a Redneck If.... Doug Grau, Foxworthy's A&R representative at Warner Bros. Records, was contacted by Warner Bros' music video department about creating a music video for the album. Grau was inspired by the works of Dickie Goodman to edit Foxworthy's stand-up material over top of a music bed. Record producer Scott Rouse was then hired to develop the musical beds. The first song, "Redneck Stomp", premiered on CMT in the summer of 1994, with a music video directed by Al Yankovic. The music video for "Redneck Stomp" is accredited with propelling You Might Be a Redneck If...'s sales from 200,000 to 2 million. A second video, "Party All Night", was quickly produced, and rose to the top of CMT's music video charts.  The success of these two music videos led to a complete album of Foxworthy's "music comedy" to be released in 1996.

"Redneck Stomp", "Redneck Games", "Redneck 12 Days of Christmas", and "'Twas the Night After Christmas" all charted on the Hot Country Songs charts between 1995 and 1996. "Redneck 12 Days of Christmas" was the highest-charting, reaching No. 18 in early 1996 and re-charting several times for each subsequent Christmas until 2000.

Track listing
"Redneck Stomp" (Jeff Foxworthy, Scott Rouse) - 2:58
"S.I.N.G.L.E." (Foxworthy) - 4:01A
"Party All Night" (Foxworthy, S. Rouse) - 3:05
feat. Little Texas and Scott Rouse
"Redneck Games" (Foxworthy, S. Rouse, Ronnie Scaife) - 3:27
feat. Alan Jackson
"Big O' Moon" (Foxworthy, S. Rouse, Dr. Jim Rouse) - 2:24
feat. Mac Wiseman and Del McCoury
"Redneck 12 Days of Christmas" (Foxworthy, Tim Wilson)B - 2:21
parody of "The Twelve Days of Christmas"
"Pure Bred Redneck" (Foxworthy, Buddy Causey, Dana Sigmon, Glenn Ashworth) - 3:04
feat. Cooter Brown
"Let Me Drive" (Foxworthy, S. Rouse, Dave MacKenzie) - 3:10
feat. Dave MacKenzie
"Copenhagen" (Robert Earl Keen) - 2:16
"Howdy from Maui" (Foxworthy, S. Rouse, Scaife) - 2:37
feat. The Beach Boys and Los Straitjackets
"'Twas the Night After Christmas" (Foxworthy, S. Rouse, Doug Grau) - 3:12
parody of "A Visit from St. Nicholas"
"Still More You Might Be a Redneck If…" (Jeff Foxworthy) - 2:57A

AComedy skit
BOriginal parody composed by Foxworthy and Wilson; additional words by Foxworthy, Rouse, Grau

Personnel
As listed in liner notes.
Danny Amis - electric guitar
Eddie Angel - electric guitar
Eddie Bayers - drums
Mike Brignardello - bass guitar
Mike Bub - acoustic bass guitar
Jason Carter - fiddle
Dan Dugmore - pedal steel guitar
Glen Duncan - fiddle
Terry Eldredge - acoustic guitar
E. Scott Esbeck - bass guitar
Shannon Forrest - drums
Paul Franklin - pedal steel guitar
Mike Geiger - acoustic guitar
Rob Hajacos - fiddle
Owen Hale - drums
Byron House - bass guitar
Mitch Humphries - piano
Kirk "Jelly Roll" Johnson - harmonica
Jeff King - electric guitar
L. J. Lester - drums
Chris Leuzinger - electric guitar, acoustic guitar
Gary Lunn - bass guitar
Dave MacKenzie - slide guitar
Liana Manis - vocals
Rob McCoury - banjo
Ronnie McCoury - mandolin
Hargus "Pig" Robbins - piano
Scott Rouse - drums, bass guitar, electric guitar, slide guitar, acoustic guitar, piano, harmonica, vocals, "everything else"
John Wesley Ryles - vocals
Mike Severs - electric guitar
Eric Silver - fiddle, banjo
Lisa Silver - vocals
Joe Spivey - fiddle
Robby Turner - pedal steel guitar
John Willis - electric guitar, acoustic guitar
Dennis Wilson - vocals
Gene Wooten - Dobro
Glenn Worf - bass guitar

Production
 Scott Rouse - all tracks except 2 and 12
 Doug Grau - tracks 2, 6, 7, 9, 11, 12
 Original Cooter Brown version of "Pure Bred Redneck" produced by Joe Scaife and Jim Cotton

Charts

Weekly charts

Year-end charts

As of 2014, sales in the United States have exceeded 715,000 copies, according to Nielsen SoundScan.

References

1996 albums
Jeff Foxworthy albums
Warner Records albums
1990s comedy albums